The 1936–37 Cupa României was the fourth edition of Romania's most prestigious football cup competition.

The title was won by Rapid București after a final against Ripensia Timișoara. It was the second cup for Rapid, and the first of six consecutive successes.

Format
The competition is an annual knockout tournament with pairings for each round drawn at random.

There are no seeds for the draw. The draw also determines which teams will play at home. Each tie is played as a single leg.

If a match is drawn after 90 minutes, the game goes in extra time, and if the scored is still tight after 120 minutes, there a replay will be played, usually at the ground of the team who were away for the first game.

From the first edition, the teams from Divizia A entered in competition in sixteen finals, rule which remained till today.

The format is almost similar with the oldest recognised football tournament in the world FA Cup.

Bracket

First round proper 

|-
|colspan=3 style="background-color:#FFCCCC;"|20 March 1937

|-
|colspan=3 style="background-color:#FFCCCC;"|21 March 1937

|}

Second round proper 

|colspan=3 style="background-color:#FFCCCC;"|25 April 1937

|}

Quarter-finals 

|colspan=3 style="background-color:#FFCCCC;"|9 May 1937

|}

Semi-finals 

|colspan=3 style="background-color:#FFCCCC;"|30 May 1937

|}

Final

References

External links
romaniansoccer.ro

Cupa României seasons
Cupa
Romania